Ola Podrida is an Austin, Texas indie rock band.  They are led by film composer David Wingo.  The band has released three albums, which have received favorable reviews in publications such as Pitchfork Media, Spin, Paste, and AllMusic.

Discography

References

External links
 Official website
 

Indie rock musical groups from Texas
Musical groups established in 2007
Musical groups from Austin, Texas
Western Vinyl artists
Grand Hotel van Cleef Records artists
Plug Research artists